Rigan may refer to:
 Refers to anything related to Riga, Latvian capital
 Rigan, Fars
 Rigan, Qir and Karzin, Fars Province
 Rigan, Razavi Khorasan
 Rigan County, in Kerman Province
 Rigan Rural District, in Kerman Province